Patrice Archetto (born on December 3, 1972) is a Canadian former pair skater. With Anabelle Langlois, he is the 2002 Four Continents silver medallist.

Career 
Archetto teamed up with Anabelle Langlois in 1998. She fractured her skull as a result of a fall on a throw jump at the 1998 Canadian Championships. Langlois and Archetto won the silver medal at the 2002 Four Continents Championships, five Grand Prix medals, and five Canadian national medals. Jan Ullmark coached the pair in Edmonton. Their partnership ended when Archetto retired from competition in 2005.

Programs 
(with Langlois)

Competitive highlights 
GP: Grand Prix

With Langlois

With Luis

References

External links

 

1972 births
Living people
Canadian male pair skaters
Olympic figure skaters of Canada
Figure skaters at the 2002 Winter Olympics
Figure skaters from Montreal
Four Continents Figure Skating Championships medalists
20th-century Canadian people
21st-century Canadian people